Negus is a surname. Notable people with the surname include:
Arthur Negus (1903—1985), British broadcaster and antiques expert
Francis Negus (died 1732), English military officer, courtier, and politician
Fred Negus (1923—2005), American football player
George Negus (born 1942), Australian author, journalist, and television presenter
James Negus (1927—2008), British philatelist and book editor
Steve Negus (born 1952), Canadian drummer and songwriter
Syd Negus (1912—1986), Australian politician
Tony Negus, Commissioner of the Australian Federal Police since 2009
Victor Negus (1887—1974), British laryngologist, surgeon and comparative anatomist